Live in Nashville may refer to:

 Live in Nashville (King Crimson album)
 Live in Nashville (Demon Hunter album)
 Live in Nashville, 2006 album by Solomon Burke
 Live in Nashville, 2011 video album by Chet Atkins, Jerry Reed and Suzy Bogguss
 Live in Nashville, video album by Waylon Jennings
 Live in Nashville, video album by Stella Parton
 Live in Nashville, video album by Anne McCue
 Live in Nashville, video album by Tammy Wynette